Kristýna Fleissnerová (born 18 August 1992) is a Czech rower. She competed in the women's double sculls event at the 2016 Summer Olympics.

References

External links
 

1992 births
Living people
Czech female rowers
Olympic rowers of the Czech Republic
Rowers at the 2016 Summer Olympics
Rowers at the 2020 Summer Olympics
Place of birth missing (living people)
Rowers at the 2010 Summer Youth Olympics